Sabrina is a 1995 American romantic comedy-drama film directed by Sydney Pollack from a screenplay by Barbara Benedek and David Rayfiel. It is a remake of Billy Wilder's 1954 film of the same name, which in turn was based upon the 1953 play Sabrina Fair.

The film stars Harrison Ford as Linus Larrabee, Julia Ormond as Sabrina and Greg Kinnear (in his first starring film role) as David Larrabee. It also features Angie Dickinson, Richard Crenna, Nancy Marchand, Lauren Holly, John Wood, Dana Ivey and Fanny Ardant.

The film was released on December 15, 1995, by Paramount Pictures. It was a box office disappointment, but earned mostly positive reviews from critics.

Plot

Sabrina Fairchild is the young daughter of the Larrabee family's chauffeur, Thomas, and has been in love with David Larrabee all her life. David is a playboy, constantly falling in love, yet he has never noticed Sabrina, much to her dismay.

Sabrina travels to Paris for a fashion internship at Vogue and returns to the Larrabee estate as an attractive, sophisticated woman. David, after initially not recognizing her, is quickly drawn to her despite being newly engaged to Elizabeth Tyson, a doctor and billionaire.

David's workaholic older brother Linus fears that David's imminent wedding to the very suitable Elizabeth might be endangered. If the wedding were to be canceled, so would a lucrative merger with the bride's family business, Tyson Electronics, run by her father Patrick. This could cost the Larrabee Corporation, run by Linus and his mother Maude, over a billion dollars.

After Linus manipulates David into sitting on champagne glasses in his back pocket, resulting in injuries that require David to be on painkillers, Linus redirects Sabrina's affections to himself in order to keep David's wedding on track. Sabrina falls in love with Linus, even though she quotes others as calling him "the world's only living heart donor" and someone who "thinks that morals are paintings on walls and scruples are money in Russia."

In the process, Linus, surprising himself, also falls in love with Sabrina. Unwilling to admit his feelings, Linus confesses his scheme to Sabrina at the last minute and sends her back to Paris. Before she gets on the plane to Paris, her father informs her that over the years of chauffeuring the father of David and Linus, the partition was always open in the car and he was able to listen to Larrabee senior's business dealings. When Mr. Larrabee sold stock, the chauffeur would also sell and when Mr. Larrabee bought, the chauffeur would also buy. He then reveals that this has allowed him to amass a personal wealth of over $2 million although he continued to work as a chauffeur since he had a happy home and situation for the family. He is now able to give Sabrina the life he and her mother dreamed for her.

Meanwhile, Linus realizes his true feelings for Sabrina, and is induced to follow her to Paris by chiding from his mother and an unexpectedly adult and responsible David, who steps into his shoes at the Larrabee Corporation with detailed plans for the merger with Tyson. Linus arrives in Paris and reunites with Sabrina, revealing his love to her and kissing her.

Cast

Production
The music was composed by John Williams and includes a song performed by Sting; both were nominated for Academy Awards.

In contrast to the 1954 film the modern version was filmed in more authentic locations. While the original used Hollywood sound stages for all its Paris scenes with the actors, except for a few stock shots, this remake made extensive in situ use of outdoor locations in Paris and the final scene in the film is of the reunited lovers on the iconic Pont des Arts. Likewise, the earlier movie used a Beverly Hills mansion to substitute for the Long Island estate but in the 1995 movie the location used to portray the Larrabee family's mansion was the 'Salutation' estate, which is on Long Island in Glen Cove, New York. This home was built around 1929 for Junius Spencer Morgan III, who was a director of the Morgan Guaranty Trust Company. His father was J. P. Morgan Jr., who was a banker and the son of J. P. Morgan, the renowned financier. The property is no longer owned by the Morgan family, but it is still in private hands and used as a residence. The movie made extensive use of this mansion's interiors during the filming. 
Another difference between the two versions is the famous line "Paris is always a good idea," spoken by Julia Ormond as Sabrina in the remake; there is a common misconception that Audrey Hepburn, portraying Sabrina in the earlier movie, also uttered the line.

Winona Ryder was offered the role of Sabrina, but turned down the offer. Gwyneth Paltrow, who had just landed the lead role in Seven, also auditioned for the lead. Despite being cast in the lead role, Ford later reflected in a 2023 interview with James Hibberd of The Hollywood Reporter that, despite getting along with director Sydney Pollack, he didn't feel like the role of Linus Larrabee was right for him, feeling because of that discomfort that Sabrina was his most challenging shoot instead of the highly-reported difficult filming of Blade Runner.

Reception

Box office
The film was a box office disappointment, with a result of US$53 million domestically, and total of $87 million worldwide.

Critical reception
The film suffered from comparisons to the original version. On Rotten Tomatoes the film has an approval rating of 63% based on reviews from 49 critics. The site's critics consensus states: "Sydney Pollack's Sabrina doesn't do anything the original didn't do better, but assured direction and a cast of seasoned stars make this a pleasant enough diversion." On Metacritic the film has a score of 56% based on reviews from 27 critics, indicating "mixed or average reviews". Audiences surveyed by CinemaScore gave the film a grade "A−" on scale of A+ to F.

Accolades

References

External links
 
 
 
 
 

1995 films
1995 comedy-drama films
1995 romantic comedy films
1995 romantic drama films
1990s American films
1990s coming-of-age comedy-drama films
1990s English-language films
1990s romantic comedy-drama films
American coming-of-age comedy-drama films
American films based on plays
American romantic comedy-drama films
Comedy film remakes
Drama film remakes
Films about social class
Films about the upper class
Films directed by Sydney Pollack
Films produced by Scott Rudin
Films produced by Sydney Pollack
Films scored by John Williams
Films set in Long Island
Films set in New York City
Films set in Paris
Films shot in Massachusetts
Films shot in New York (state)
Films shot in New York City
Films shot in Paris
Paramount Pictures films
Remakes of American films
Romance film remakes